The 1914–15 West Virginia Mountaineers men's basketball team represents the University of West Virginia during the 1914–15 college men's basketball season. The head coach was George Pyle, coaching his first season with the Mountaineers.

Schedule

|-

References

West Virginia Mountaineers men's basketball seasons
West Virginia
West Virginia Mountaineers men's b
West Virginia Mountaineers men's b